Events in the year 1886 in Iceland.

Incumbents 

 Monarch: Christian IX
 Minister for Iceland: Johannes Nellemann

Events 

 1 July – The national bank (Landsbanki) begins operations.
 A supplementary session of the Althing was first held in 1886.
 Staðarkirkja was constructed.
 Kirkjubólskirkja was constructed.

Births 

 18 May – Jakob Thorarensen, writer and poet.
 14 September – Sigurður Nordal, writer and ambassador.

References 

 
1880s in Iceland
Years of the 19th century in Iceland
Iceland
Iceland